Sepideh (also Romanized as Sepīdeh; also known as Sefīdeh) is a village in Sofla Rural District, Zavareh District, Ardestan County, Isfahan Province, Iran. At the 2006 census, its population was 213, in 87 families.

References 

Populated places in Ardestan County